Sodium channel β-subunit 4, also known as SCN4B or Naβ4, is an auxiliary sodium channel subunit that can alter the kinetics of sodium channels. The protein is encoded by the SCN4B gene. Mutations in the SCN4B are associated with long QT syndrome.

SCN4B might additionally function as a cell adhesion molecule.

See also
 Sodium channel

References

External links 
 

Sodium channels